John Dalrymple (1734–1779) was a Scottish writer who twice served as Lord Provost of Edinburgh (1770 and 1779).

He wrote numerous political tracts, among which Answers for the Right Honourable John Dalrymple, Lord Provost of the city of Edinburgh, and others; to the petition of James Stoddart, Esq; late old Provost, and James Stirling, Esq; late one of the bailies of said city, and others is the most widely preserved.

John Taylor of Caroline, in his Inquiry into the Principles and Policy of the Governments of the United States, noted that he had read a "book [...] written by a Sir John Dalrymple, an Englishman [sic], containing a proposition for a reunion between England [sic] and the United States, upon terms nearly similar to the constitution of Neuchattel" (p. 113). (Dalrymple was in fact a Scot, and the proposed reunion would have been with the Kingdom of Great Britain, not "England".)

He lived at Queen Street in Edinburgh's New Town.

He is buried in the Covenanters Prison section of Greyfriars Kirkyard.

References

1734 births
1779 deaths
Scottish political writers
People of the Scottish Enlightenment
Lord Provosts of Edinburgh
Burials at Greyfriars Kirkyard